The Villain Still Pursued Her is a 1940 American comedy film directed by Edward F. Cline and starring Billy Gilbert and Buster Keaton. It is a parody of old stage melodramas but is based primarily on The Drunkard, a 19th-century prohibitionist play by William H. Smith that had also been lampooned in other productions, most notably in the 1934 W. C. Fields comedy The Old Fashioned Way.

The overall format of the film is that of a stage play, with much dialogue spoken directly to the camera.

Buster Keaton is notable in a speaking but minor supporting role as Dalton, a family friend.

Plot

Mary Wilson lives with her mother in a cottage but cannot pay the mortgage. Mr. Cribbs, a mustachioed villain with cloak and cane, knocks on the door and spells out the Wilsons' financial position, suggesting that Mary should work in New York.

Cribbs hides while waiting for Mary to pass, but she also hides. A young man named Edward Middleton stops to pick up an injured bird and Cribbs questions him. Mary intervenes and instantly falls in love with Middleton. Mary marries Hamilton, who extols the virtues of an alcohol-free life, but Cribbs tricks him into drinking rum, and Mary smells it on his breath.

Eight years later, Hamilton is a drunkard. He has hidden bottles of whiskey and is able to down an entire bottle in ten seconds. He returns home to Mary and their daughter and chops down the cherry tree that his father had planted.

In New York in 1850, Middleton is living as a drunkard on the street, and Cribbs tries to trick him into deeper crime. Meanwhile, Mary lives alone in poverty with her daughter, her mother having died. Cribbs tries to press himself on Mary and she is saved by William Dalton.

Back in New York, Middleton is about to be arrested for drunkenness but is saved by a comic pie fight. Middleton then encounters the philanthropist Frederick Healy, who makes him sign a pledge of sobriety. Cribbs has Middleton forge the signature of Healy on a $5,000 check and he sends a boy to the bank to cash it, but Dalton exposes the crime.

Cribbs is exposed for various crimes and Middleton receives a certificate of sobriety.

Cast
Hugh Herbert as Frederick Healy
Anita Louise as Mary Wilson
Alan Mowbray as Mr. Cribbs
Buster Keaton as William Dalton
Joyce Compton as Hazel Dalton
Richard Cromwell as Edward Middleton
Billy Gilbert as Announcer
Margaret Hamilton as Mrs. Wilson
Diane Fisher as Julia
Franklin Pangborn as Bartender
Charles Judels as Dubois
William Farnum as Vagabond

See also
 The Villain Still Pursued Her, 1937 Terrytoons cartoon

References

External links
The Villain Still Pursued Her at IMDb
Full copy of the film available at Internet Archive
The Villain Still Pursued Her at TCMDB

1940 films
1940 comedy films
American comedy films
Films directed by Edward F. Cline
American black-and-white films
RKO Pictures films
1940s American films